Aretha Thurmond, née Hill (born August 14, 1976) is an American discus thrower.

Thurmond is a 1994 graduate of Renton High School and in 1998 she graduated from the University of Washington with a bachelor's degree in sociology.

Thurmond is currently employed with USA Track & Field as the Managing Director of International Teams.

College career 
Thurmond was a member of the track team at the University of Washington 1995–98.She was a discus thrower. During her time she set many collegiate records. Her records include ones in the Pac-10 Conference. She was also a four-time NCAA All-American.

Personal life 
She is married to the former University of Washington throws coach, Reedus Thurmond. They have one son together. His name is Theo.

Aretha Thurmond never strayed away from the sport. She resides in Indianapolis with her family. Since she is working for USA Track & Field, Thurmond earned her Executive Masters in Sport Organization Management.

International competitions

References

External links
 
 
 Aretha Thurmond staff profile at legacy.USATF.org
 
 
 

1976 births
Living people
Track and field athletes from Seattle
American female discus throwers
African-American female track and field athletes
Olympic track and field athletes of the United States
Athletes (track and field) at the 1996 Summer Olympics
Athletes (track and field) at the 2004 Summer Olympics
Athletes (track and field) at the 2008 Summer Olympics
Athletes (track and field) at the 2012 Summer Olympics
Pan American Games gold medalists for the United States
Pan American Games medalists in athletics (track and field)
Athletes (track and field) at the 1999 Pan American Games
Athletes (track and field) at the 2003 Pan American Games
Athletes (track and field) at the 2011 Pan American Games
World Athletics Championships athletes for the United States
Washington Huskies women's track and field athletes
Medalists at the 2011 Pan American Games
21st-century African-American sportspeople
21st-century African-American women
20th-century African-American sportspeople
20th-century African-American women